Verdet Emily Caci Kessler (born 24 May 1994) is an Australian badminton player. Kessler was the women's singles national champion in 2013 and 2014, and also won the women's singles title at the Oceania Championships in 2014.

Early life and career
Kessler is the daughter of a Bermudian ballet dancer (Verniece Benjamin) and German handballer (Detlef Kessler). She began playing badminton at the age of seven after trying it at a holiday clinic, taking up weekly training at the age of twelve and joining her first junior state team a year later. Her home club is the Glenelg Badminton Club.

Career
In 2009, Kessler won the girls' doubles event at the U-19 Australian Junior International tournament partnered with Leanne Choo. She was also selected to join the Australian Junior Commonwealth Games squad.
In 2011, she won the silver and bronze medal at the Oceania Junior Championships in the mixed team and girls' doubles respectively. In 2012, she represented her country at the World Junior Championships in Japan. In 2014, she won the women's singles title at the Oceania Championships after beat Michelle Chan of New Zealand. At the same year, she competed at the Glasgow Commonwealth Games. Also in 2014, at the Ede Clendinnen Shield event, she was awarded the  Cliff Cutt Trophy for exhibiting the "highest standards of sportsmanship, personality, court demeanour, playing ability and appearance throughout the tournament".

Achievements

Oceania Championships
Women's singles

Women's doubles

Oceania Junior Championships
Girls' doubles

References

External links 
 
 
 
 
 

1994 births
Living people
Sportspeople from Adelaide
Australian female badminton players
Commonwealth Games competitors for Australia
Badminton players at the 2014 Commonwealth Games